Jean de Gribaldy (18 July 1922 – 2 January 1987) was a French road cyclist and directeur sportif. He rode in the Tour de France in 1947 and 1948.

Biography
Born in Besançon, Doubs département, Gribaldi was a professional racing cyclist from 1945 to 1954. He began a successful career as a directeur sportif in the mid-1960s.

Nicknamed le Vicomte ("the Viscount") due to his aristocratic ancestry, he discovered Sean Kelly, Joaquim Agostinho, and Éric Caritoux. He gave a second chance to many riders dropped by other teams. Most saw their career take a new dimension under Jean de Gribaldy.

A street in Besançon, where he was a shopkeeper, has been named Montée Jean de Gribaldy since 1994. Each year, a Jean de Gribaldy cycling race is organized in Besançon.

Bibliography 
  Pierre Diéterlé, Jean de Gribaldy, la légende du Vicomte, Editions du Sekoya, 2014

References

External links
 jeandegribaldy.com, a complete site about Jean de Gribaldy (French)
 Cyclismag: Le Vicomte conteur (French)
 Cyclismag: De Gri, le découvreur de pépites (French)
 Cyclismag: Bouts d'ficelle (French)

1922 births
1987 deaths
Sportspeople from Besançon
French male cyclists
Cyclists from Bourgogne-Franche-Comté
Directeur sportifs
20th-century French people